Jakob Olsson may refer to:
 Jakob Olsson (footballer)
 Jakob Olsson (ice hockey)